Zgornje Negonje is a settlement in the Municipality of Rogaška Slatina in eastern Slovenia. It lies on the southeastern slopes of Mount Boč. The wider area around Rogaška Slatina is part of the traditional region of Styria. It is now included in the Savinja Statistical Region.

Name
The name Zgornje Negonje means 'upper Negonje', distinguishing the village from neighboring Spodnje Negonje (literally, 'lower Negonje'), which lies at an elevation about  lower. The name Negonje is probably a possessive form of the personal name *Negojinъ, elided from *Negojin'e (selo) 'Negojinъ's (village)', referring to an early inhabitant of the place.

References

External links
 Zgornje Negonje on Geopedia

Populated places in the Municipality of Rogaška Slatina